Hervé Gorce (3 December 1952 – 14 August 2008) was a professional football defender who played for USL Dunkerque and Stade Lavallois. He was also a Ligue de Football Professionnel board member.

Career
Born in Dunkerque, Gorce began playing youth football with local side USL Dunkerque. He joined Dunkerque's senior side in 1972, and made 164 Ligue 2 appearances for the club during his career. He also played one season in Ligue 1 with Laval.

After retiring from playing football, Gorce became an administrator. He was appointed director of several clubs, including USL Dunkerque, and joined the Ligue de Football Professionnel board in 2001.

Personal
Gorce died at age 55 on 14 August 2008.

References

External links
 Profile at Tangofoot

1952 births
2008 deaths
French footballers
Stade Lavallois players
Association football defenders